Valentino Grant (born 21 April 1964, Rome) is an Italian politician who was elected as a member of the European Parliament in 2019.

He is the President Board of Directors of Banca di Credito Cooperativo Terra di Lavoro San Vincenzo dè Paoli.

References

Living people
1964 births
MEPs for Italy 2019–2024
Lega Nord MEPs
Lega Nord politicians
Politicians from Rome